Charles Grandison Williams (October 18, 1829March 30, 1892) was an American lawyer and Republican politician. He represented the state of Wisconsin for ten years in the United States House of Representatives, from 1873 to 1883, and was chairman of the House Foreign Affairs Committee.

Biography

Born in Royalton, New York, Williams pursued an academic course and studied law in Rochester, New York.  He moved to Wisconsin in 1856, after the death of his first wife, and settled in Janesville, in Rock County.  He was admitted to the bar and commenced practice in Janesville, where he would form a law partnership with David Noggle and Henry A. Patterson.  

He was elected to the Wisconsin State Senate in 1868 and re-elected in 1870.  He was chosen as President pro tempore of the Senate for the 1871 and 1872 sessions.  He was also a presidential elector for Ulysses S. Grant in the 1868 United States presidential election.

In 1872, Williams was elected to represent Wisconsin's 1st congressional district, and was subsequently re-elected four times, serving from March 4, 1873 until March 3, 1883.  In the 47th Congress (1881-1883), he served as chairman of the Committee on Foreign Affairs.

He was defeated in the 1882 election while seeking a sixth term in Congress.  After his defeat, he was appointed register of the land office for the Dakota Territory, and moved to Watertown, Dakota Territory, where he remained for the rest of his life.  He died there on March 30, 1892.

He was interred at Oak Hill Cemetery in Janesville, Wisconsin.

Personal life and family

His first wife, Harriet Gregg, died in 1856.

His second wife was Mary M. Noggle, daughter Judge David Noggle, his early law partner and one of the founding fathers of Janesville. They had a daughter, Kate Anna Williams (born 1861), and a son, Ward David Williams (born September 4, 1864, and died March 28, 1926, in Baltimore, Maryland).

Electoral history

Wisconsin Senate (1868, 1870)

| colspan="6" style="text-align:center;background-color: #e9e9e9;"| General Election, November 8, 1870

U.S. House of Representatives (1872, 1874, 1876)

| colspan="6" style="text-align:center;background-color: #e9e9e9;"| General Election, November 5, 1872

| colspan="6" style="text-align:center;background-color: #e9e9e9;"| General Election, November 3, 1874

| colspan="6" style="text-align:center;background-color: #e9e9e9;"| General Election, November 7, 1876

U.S. House of Representatives (1878, 1880, 1882)

| colspan="6" style="text-align:center;background-color: #e9e9e9;"| General Election, November 5, 1878

| colspan="6" style="text-align:center;background-color: #e9e9e9;"| General Election, November 2, 1880

| colspan="6" style="text-align:center;background-color: #e9e9e9;"| General Election, November 7, 1882

References

External links
 
 

1829 births
1892 deaths
People from Royalton, New York
Politicians from Janesville, Wisconsin
Republican Party Wisconsin state senators
Republican Party members of the United States House of Representatives from Wisconsin
19th-century American politicians